Streptartemon is a genus of air-breathing land snails, terrestrial pulmonate gastropod mollusks in the subfamily Streptaxinae of the family Streptaxidae.

Distribution 
The distribution of the genus Streptartemon includes South America:
 Brazil
 Bolivia
 Colombia
 Venezuela
 Guyana

Species
Species within the genus Streptartemon include:
 Streptartemon abunaensis (Baker, 1914)
 Streptartemon comboides (d’Orbigny, 1835)
 Streptartemon cookeanus (Baker, 1914)
 Streptartemon crossei (Pfeiffer, 1867)
 Streptartemon cryptodon (Moricand, 1851)
 Streptartemon cumingianus (Pfeiffer, 1849)
 Streptartemon decipiens (Crosse, 1865)
 Streptartemon deformis (Férussac, 1821)
 Streptartemon deplanchei (Drouet, 1859)
 Streptartemon elatus (Moricand, 1846)
 Streptartemon extraneus Haas, 1955
 Streptartemon glaber (Pfeiffer, 1849)
 Streptartemon laevigatus (d'Orbigny, 1835)
 Streptartemon quixadensis (Baker, 1914)
 Streptartemon streptodon (Moricand, 1851)
 Streptartemon waukeen Salvador & C.M. Cunha, 2020
 Streptartemon zischkai (Haas, 1952)
Species brought into synonymy
 Streptartemon candeanus (Petit, 1842): synonym of Streptaxis candei Petit de la Saussaye, 1842
 Streptartemon dejectus (Petit, 1842): synonym of Odontartemon dejectus (Moricand, 1836) (junior homonym of Helix dejecta Moricand, 1836)
 Streptartemon huberi Thach, 2016: synonym of Indoartemon huberi (Thach, 2016) (original combination)
 Streptartemon quixadensis [sic] accepted as Streptartemon quixadaensis (F. Baker, 1914) (misspelling)

References

 d'Orbigny, A., 1835 Voyage dans l'Amérique méridionale (le Brésil, la République orientale de l'Uruguay, la république Argentina, la Patagonie, la République de Chili, la République de Bolivia, la République du Pérou), exécuté pendant les années 1826, 1827, 1828, 1829, 1830, 1831, 1832 et 1833, Tome cinquième, 3eme partie : Mollusques, Atlas, p. Pl 3-8, 17-23, 25, 55

External links
 Kobelt, W. (1905-1906). Die Raublungenschnecken (Agnatha). Abtheilung 2, Streptaxidae und Daudebardiidae. In: Systematisches Conchylien-Cabinet von Martini & Chemnitz, ed. 2. Bd. 1, Abt. 12B, Theil 2: 211 pp. Nürnberg, Bauer & Raspe.[pp. 1-96, pls 42-59 (1905); 97-211, pls 60-71 (1906). Nürnberg: 1-211.]

Streptaxidae